Ed Hottle is an American football coach. He is the head football coach at Stevenson University in Stevenson, Maryland, a position he has held since 2010. Stevenson began play in 2011. Hottle served as the head football coach at Gallaudet University in Washington, D.C. from 2007 to 2009.

Head coaching record

College

References

External links
 Stevenson profile

Year of birth missing (living people)
Living people
Denison Big Red football coaches
Frostburg State Bobcats football coaches
Frostburg State Bobcats football players
Gallaudet Bison football coaches
Stevenson Mustangs football coaches
Wesley Wolverines football coaches
High school football coaches in Maryland